Zlatko Kesler (born 17 March 1960 in Selenča) is a Serbian disabled table tennis player.

He has won five medals at Paralympic Games and was the Serbian flag bearer at the 2008 Summer Paralympics held in Beijing, China.

External links
 Profile on STKI SPIN Novi Sad
 The official website of the London 2012 Paralympic Games - Zlatko Kesler profile 

1960 births
Serbian male table tennis players
Yugoslav table tennis players
Table tennis players at the 1992 Summer Paralympics
Table tennis players at the 1996 Summer Paralympics
Table tennis players at the 2000 Summer Paralympics
Table tennis players at the 2008 Summer Paralympics
Table tennis players at the 2012 Summer Paralympics
Paralympic table tennis players of Serbia
Medalists at the 1992 Summer Paralympics
Medalists at the 1996 Summer Paralympics
Medalists at the 2000 Summer Paralympics
Medalists at the 2004 Summer Paralympics
Medalists at the 2012 Summer Paralympics
Paralympic medalists in table tennis
Paralympic gold medalists for Yugoslavia
Paralympic silver medalists for Yugoslavia
Paralympic bronze medalists for Serbia and Montenegro
Paralympic silver medalists for Serbia
Living people